Yamashina may refer to:

 Yamashina Botanical Research Institute, Kyoto, Japan
 Yamashina Institute for Ornithology
 Yamashina Mido, a Buddhist temple in Kyoto, Japan
  Yamashina Oyakata, an elder name in sumo currently held by Toyohibiki Ryūta
 Yamashina Station, in Kyoto, Japan
 Yamashina-ku, Kyoto, a ward in the city
 Yamashina-no-miya (山階) ōke (princely house), a branch of the Japanese Imperial Family
  (1900–1989), Japanese ornithologist

Japanese-language surnames